Oh, This Father (German: Oh, dieser Vater) is a West German comedy television series which aired on ARD between 1978 and 1981. It was inspired by the British television series Father, Dear Father. Willy Millowitsch plays the father of two teenage daughters.

References

Bibliography
 Jovan Evermann. Der Serien-Guide: M-S. Schwarzkopf & Schwarzkopf, 1999.

External links
 

1978 German television series debuts
1981 German television series endings
1970s comedy television series
1980s comedy television series
German-language television shows